St. Bartholomew's Protestant Episcopal Church and Rectory is a historic Episcopal church and rectory located at 1227 Pacific St., east of Bedford Avenue in Crown Heights, Brooklyn, New York, New York. It was built in 1886 in the Romanesque Revival style.  It is constructed of brick with stone trim and topped by a slate roof.  It features a squat, battered stone tower crowned by an ogival, tiled roof.  The two story brick and stone rectory features twin gables and ogival tower.

It was listed on the National Register of Historic Places in 1980.

See also
List of New York City Designated Landmarks in Brooklyn
National Register of Historic Places listings in Kings County, New York

References

External links
Official website
NYC American Guild of Organists website

Properties of religious function on the National Register of Historic Places in Brooklyn
Churches completed in 1886
New York City Designated Landmarks in Brooklyn
19th-century Episcopal church buildings
Romanesque Revival church buildings in New York City